Elliott Lynch, AIA, was an American architect active in the late 19th and early 20th centuries in New York City. His office was located at 347 Fifth Avenue in Manhattan. Many of the buildings he designed remain standing.

For a time Lynch was a partner with William R. Orchard in the firm of Lynch and Orchard, which designed many buildings for the Roman Catholic Church.

Works
St. Stephen's Parish School (Manhattan) (1897 – c.1902), Manhattan, New York City. The school was completed by 1902
The Parkview (1902), Central Park West, New York City.
118 West 131st Street, Convent Ave, (1903), a 4-story brick and stone rectory. Built for the Roman Catholic Annunciation Church New York, 601 W 133rd Street for  $15,000.00.
St. Matthew's Roman Catholic Church, Brooklyn, New York
St. Saviour Church, Park Slope, Brooklyn
112 Amsterdam Avenue (1905), and 97th Street, a four-story brick and stone residential building built for the Parish of the Church of the Holy Name of Jesus (New York City) and 207 W 96th Street for $25,000.
Sacred Heart Roman Catholic Church (1910), 1253 Shakespeare Ave. (W. 168 St.) Bronx, New York The New York Times reported in 1910: "New Bronx Church: Plans were filed for a new brick church and rectory to replace the present frame edifices of the Sacred Heart Roman Catholic Church, in Shakespeare Avenue, between 168th and 169th Streets. The church is to occupy a plot 75 by '280, and the rectory 25 by 280, the total cost being placed at 590000 by the architect, Elliott Lynch."
St. Gregory the Great Roman Catholic Church and Parish School, New York City (1912), built for between $110,000-120,000.
110-12-14 West End Avenue (1915), a four-story fireproof garage built for Louis Richard at $40,000.
100 East Broadway and 131st Street, a four-story fireproof garage for the ALS Realty Corp at $75,000.
Holy Trinity Church, Westfield, New Jersey
St. Brendan Church, Flatbush, Brooklyn
St. Raymond Church, East Rockaway, New York
St. Gregory the Great Church, Harrison, New York
St. Simon Church (1926 plan), New York City
All Souls Church, East Orange, New Jersey

References	
Notes

American ecclesiastical architects
Architects from New York City
Architects of Roman Catholic churches
Year of death missing
Year of birth missing